William Brown was an English footballer who played in the Football League for Nottingham Forest and Notts County.

References

Year of birth unknown
Year of death unknown
Date of birth unknown
Date of death unknown
English footballers
Association football goalkeepers
English Football League players
Nottingham Forest F.C. players
Notts County F.C. players
Notts Rangers F.C. players